It Seemed Like a Good Idea at the Time is a Canadian comedy film, directed by John Trent and released in 1975. One of John Candy's earliest films, he plays the minor role of an investigating police officer. However, for marketing/publicity reasons, Candy appears on the cover of the DVD release.

Plot
Sweeney (Anthony Newley) is a playwright on a career decline. He spends much of his time wheedling money and beer out of his artistic friend Moriarty (Isaac Hayes). One of his few highlights is weekly sex with his ex-wife Georgina (Stefanie Powers). She is remarried to a rich but vile construction developer (Henry Ramer), but Sweeney and Georgina are still in love. Sweeney's escapades end with a fake kidnapping scam. This gets the attention of two inept police officers, played by John Candy and Lawrence Dane. These two end up dressed as garbage men in the chase scene finale; everything winds up with a happy ending.

Candy and Dane's characters eventually spun off their own film, Find the Lady.

References

External links

1975 films
1970s crime comedy films
Canadian crime comedy films
English-language Canadian films
Films shot in Toronto
1975 comedy films
Films directed by John Trent (director)
1970s English-language films
1970s Canadian films